Baalveer Returns is an Indian fantasy television series which aired from 10 September 2019 to 30 June 2021 on Sony SAB. It is the second instalment to Baalveer franchise and is a sequel to Baal Veer and followed by Baalveer 3.

Series overview

Plot

Season 1 
Timnasa, an evil enchantress and the queen of Kaal Lok, begins a quest to rule the whole universe and become the most powerful and evil entity. She attacks and destroys the Pari Lok but Baalveer saves the surviving fairies, who are Masti Pari, Pani Pari, Vayu Pari, Jwala Pari, Dhwani Pari, Netra Pari, Saral Pari and Baal Pari. They take refuge in Veer Lok whose leader is a white lion, Shaurya. Baalveer becomes weaker as he was injured in the attack. On Shaurya's instructions, Baalveer goes to Earth as Dev, with the fairies as his sisters, to find the next Baalveer, as he needs help to fight Timnasa. Timnasa also learns of the new Baalveer.

The new Baalveer is a very mischievous ten-year-old boy named Vivaan, who lives in Bharat Nagar with his grandfather, his Mother Karuna, and his elder sister Khushi. At the beginning, Baalveer and Vivaan started hating each other. Soon, Baalveer finds that Vivaan is the new Baalveer and discloses his reality to Vivaan and takes him to Veer Lok where he is made the 'Junior Baalveer'. Both the Baalveers and the members of Veer Lok cross all the hurdles and fight Timnasa and defeat her every time. At the same time friendship is growing between two Baalveers. They started loving each other and taking care of each other.

A long time ago, Timnasa had captured Sarvakaal, a monstrous sage who taught Timnasa black magic, as he knows the identity of the person who'll kill Timnasa. However, he refuses to reveal his identity. Baalveer finds Sarvakaal's prison and Timnasa's past, about how she was banished from Pari Lok where she was a Pari and was made Baalveer for a day because of her evil and egoistic intentions. Baalveer acknowledges this and pretends to lose his powers and memory and stays as a commoner with Vivaan and his family as Vivaan's brother Debu. He acquires a new avatar, Nakabposh. He befriends Ananya, a girl who is threatened by Timnasa, and also receives help from Sarvakaal. They together go to Earth to find the hidden power which is destined to kill Timnasa. While doing so, it is revealed that Vivaan is Ananya's long-lost brother and their biological mother is Devaki, the former queen of Shwet Lok which was destroyed by Timnasa. The trio form 'Team Shadow'. Vivaan is the hidden power who is destined to kill Timnasa and he overcomes the hurdles and takes Sarvakaal's infinite energy. By this new power, he puts an end to Timnasa's trinity except for Tauba Tauba. During the battle, Masti Pari is killed by Bhaymar and Vayu Pari and Jwala Pari sacrifice themselves as Timnasa's weapons hit them, to protect the Earth.

Later, when Debu opens the secret message of Timnasa, which she had handed over to him before her death, Timnasa's spirit tells Debu that his biological parents were killed by Shaurya and the fairies.
The series unveils the underwater kingdom of Shinkai, which is ruled by Jalraj Kaikos. The commander-in-chief Bambaal plots to rule over the whole universe, along with his sidekick Milsa.

Bambaal and Shaurya reveal the story of a chemical scientist of the Veer Lok, named Jaikaas who had turned evil and plotted to make a weapon that would destroy the earth in 2020. He was stopped by Shaurya and hence he tried to escape with his two newborn sons. Shaurya attacked Jaikaas and one son fell in a desert while Jaikaas and his other son landed at desert. Bambaal tells about an egg in Shinkai, and that a man will be born from it, prophesied to be the ultimate. Jaikaas, before dying, protected his son who fell with him in the sea by putting him in an egg and he is the one Bambaal awaits. When he comes out of the egg he is named Ray. Ray loved Bambaal and Milsa as his father and mother and was ready to do anything for them.

Debu wants to know about his past from Shaurya and fairies, but he fails. Baal veer captures Milsa but Bambaal secretly kills her to hide his identity from Debu and Vivaan. Baalveer tells Vivaan about him being Nakabposh leaving him shocked. Ray's full powers are unleashed by Debu's blood after he threatens him for Vivaan's life. The bond between Debu and Vivaan grows stronger that they cannot able to live without each other as they became one. After a series of incidents, Baalveer captures Bambaal and kills him. Ray kills Baalveer out of anger. He tries to manipulate Vivaan and Ananya. Baalveer, who is now a spirit, can only touch someone if that person is in danger. He saves Vivan many times. Vivan, who misses Baalveer more than anyone, becomes suspicious about the unknown person who is saving him many times. Ray makes a cooling glass that can see spirits. Baalveer Tracticali gives the glasses to Vivan. God gives Baalveer his life back by seeing the love of Debu and Vivaan for each other and telling them that it was the test for their love. Ray creates problems for the Baalveer's and the fairies. He Revived Bhaymar, Timnasa, and Akroor to revenge Bambaal's and Milsa's Death.

Timnasa had a plan to destroy the earth and both Baalveer had to find four keys before Timnasa. However, Timnasa got the ultimate power - A Red Diamond to destroy the earth and Baalveers found a White Diamond to stop Timnasa from destroying the earth. Baalveers sacrifices himself by joining the two stones, the red one and the white one, for saving the earth and Timnasa also dies.

Season 2
A new character Happy is introduced, who is a lookalike of Baalveer who lives in Kanpur. And Kaal, another lookalike of Baalveer with evil intentions who was imprisoned by Swarna Shaurya a very long time ago. and kept frozen as a statue in Drak Lok gets freed from prison. Baalveers's energy star divides into 6 pieces and goes into the body of the 6 other look-alikes of Baalveer, which helps Kaal to escape from prison and to obtain Baalveer's all the powers, Kaal decides to kill other lookalikes of Baalveer. Kaal goes to the infinite library to know the location of his five other look-alikes. He discovers his sidekick Mauka Mauka at the library. Along with Kazo, Kaal and Mauka Mauka are able to slip out of Drak Lok without getting noticed by  Shaurya, and Swarna Shaurya. On the other hand, Happy tries to understand his powers and he is unfamiliar with how he got his powers. Karuna comes to Kanpur with Mrs. Diwali to visit a temple and while returning, she accidentally meets Happy. As Happy is the lookalike of Debu, Karuna gets shocked and is not able to understand what is happening. Meanwhile, the Fairies try to find Baalveer's lookalike on Earth to protect him from Kaal. On the other hand, Kaal reaches the Snow Universe to kill a look-alike of Baalveer but when he tries to enter an igloo where the look-alike of Baalveer lives he cannot get in because of a Suraksha Kavach. After the multiple futile tries of shaurya of protecting the lookalike of the snow universe from Kaal, Kaal manages to kill the lookalike and gets his powers. Meanwhile, Karuna goes to Happy's house to order a wedding but is unable to recognize Happy as he has color on his face. When Karuna was about to leave she forgets her bag at Happy's house.

Happy notices it and tries to give Karuna her bag but she is already on a bus. When Happy tries to run the magical powers of Baalveer triggers and he is able to run at super-speed and gives the bag to Karuna but she does not see him. After that, when Happy goes to collect the gas cylinder, he helps a truck driver by getting his truck out by using a single hand. Gradually, he notices his increasing powers and tries to get control of it.

Later, Happy and his family visits Bharat nagar colony to conduct wedding ceremony of Diwali's relative. The residents of Bharat Nagar are shocked to see Happy, lookalike of Debu and get emotional assuming him as Debu has returned after his death. However, it is revealed to them that Happy is just a lookalike of Debu. Ray and Bhaymar are doubtful of Happy being Baalveer and plans to unmask the real identity of Happy. In Drak lok, Shauryas manage to safeguard remaining 3 lookalikes of Baalveer at a secret place.

However, Kaal finds them and  manages to kill 1 another lookalike of Baalveer and gain his powers, while Happy also realizes that he is more powerful than before and practices to control his mind and powers. The Fairies tries to collect energies of seven Shauryas from seven universe to defeat Kaal and tries to save remaining lookalikes.

Cast

Main 
 Dev Joshi as 
 Baalveer / Dev / Debu / Naqabposh, biological son of Jaikaas, biological brother of Ray, the savior of Dharti Lok; Vivaan's brother; Ananya's love interest. He is the son of Rani pari of Parilok. He is the adopted son of Baal Pari. He lived in Pari Lok for years but later moved to Veer Lok after Pari Lok's destruction, along with the fairies who survived the massacre under Shaurya's protection and guidance. He killed Bhaymaar in the Antim Yuddh. He later sacrifices his life along with junior Baalveer and got killed along with Timnasa due to the explosion caused by linking the Red and White Diamond. (2019–2021)
 as Happy Pandey, a happy-go-lucky guy from Kanpur, a lookalike of Baalveer who got 1/6th of his powers after his death. (2021)
 as Kaal, an evil lookalike of Baalveer from Drak Lok who got 1/6th portion of his powers and wants to kill the other lookalikes to obtain all the powers of the dead Baalveer. He has a powerful pet dragon named Kazo whom he has put under his control and is used as a vehicle by him. (2021)
 Lookalike from Heem Universe, another lookalike of Baalveer from snow universe (Universe no.1) who was kidnapped by Kaal and killed by Kazo. (2021)
 Lookalike from 5th universe, who is taken by Vivaan to Drak Lok. He is a great fighter who is then kidnapped by Kaal. (2021)
Lookalike from 3rd universe, who is taken by Vivaan to Drak Lok. (2021)
 Lookalike from 6th Universe, a tribal person taken by Vivaan to Drak Lok. He is kidnapped and killed by Kaal, who then gets the share of his (humshakal's) powers. (2021)
 Vansh Sayani as Vivaan / Baalveer; Baalveer's brother. He is the son of  Queen Devaki of Shweth Lok. He is the adopted son of Karuna. He is the biological younger brother of Ananya and the adoptive younger brother of Khushi. He is the secret superpower who was destined to kill the evil Queen of Kaal Lok, Timnasa. He killed Timnasa and her assistant Jabdali in the Antim Yuddh (the Ultimate Battle).   (2019–2021)
 Anahita Bhooshan as Ananya/Karigar Pari, a gymnast and member of Bharat Nagar Society. She is the daughter of Queen Devaki and Princess of Swetlok. Ananya is the biological elder sister of Vivaan. She was sent to Earth by Timnasa to keep an eye on Baalveers, but met Naqabposh and instantly fell for him. She and Debu were at loggerheads initially and do not get along with each other but later on, they became friends. She was originally a human but now a fairy of Veer Lok with the power to create anything by drawing in the air. (2020–2021)

Recurring 
 Pavitra Punia as Timnasa/Tanisha, the evil queen of Dark Realm and a big enemy of the Baalveers. She was called 'Bhay Rani' (Queen of Fear). Timnasa was banished from Fairy Realm by fairies because of her ego and evil. To take revenge on fairies and the people of Fairy Realm, Timnasa went to Dark Realm, imprisoned the sage Sarvakaal, and became the Queen. She was killed by Junior Baalveer, Vivaan in the Ultimate Battle but was revived by Ray and Bhaymaar. She was killed along with  Balveers due to the explosion caused by the linking of Red and White Diamond. (2019–2020, 2021)
 Arsheen Naamdar as the child form of Timnasa. (2019–2020)
 Shridhar Watsar 
 as Dooba Dooba, best friend of Baal Veer and a young she-elephant calf named Kiki. He is the elder twin brother of Tauba Tauba but is against him as Tauba Tauba is evil. (2019–2021)
 as Tauba Tauba, the sidekick of Bhaymar. He is the younger twin brother of Dooba Dooba but is against him as Dooba Dooba is on Baalveer's side. (2019–2021)
 as Mauka Mauka, the servant/sidekick of Vinasham Kaal and lookalike of Dooba Dooba and Tauba Tauba. (2021)
 Aditya Sidhu as Bhaymaar, the loyal warlord of Dark Realm. He always competed with Timnasa to take over the throne of Dark Realm by defeating the Baalveers. He was called 'Bhay Raja' by Tauba Tauba and was extremely skilled at controlling venomous creatures. He was well-liked by Timnasa for his loyalty towards the Dark Realm. He was killed by Senior Baalveer but returned to take his revenge. (2019–2021)
 Atul Verma as Jabdali, a loyal companion of Timanasa. He was killed by Vivaan. (2019–2020)
 Shailendra Pandey 
 as Shaurya (Voice), a white lion who is the guardian of Veer Lok and Mentor of Baalveers. (2019–2021)
as Akroor (Voice),  a black panther who was the protector of Kaal Lok who was defeated by Shaurya in Antim Yuddh but returned along with Timnasa. (2019–2020, 2021)
 Sharmilee Raj as Baal Pari/Kaal Pari, a fairy of parilok with the powers of tresses and curls. She is the adoptive mother of Baalveer. She was transformed into Kaal Pari by Timnasa (2019, 2020–21)
 Krutika Desai as Masti Pari, a fairy of Fairy Realm or Megha on Earth as one of Baalveer's sisters. Most of the time, she accompanied and guided Vivaan. She had the power to increase or decrease her size. She was killed by Bhaymar in the 'Antim Yuddh' for saving Ananya. She was also the love interest of Inspector Girpade. (2019–2020)
 Bhaweeka Chaudhary as Paani Pari/Payal, a fairy of Pari Lok with the power of water; Payal on Earth as one of Baalveer's sisters. She helped Baalveer and Vivan in their adventures with the powers of water. (2019–2021)
 Anuradha Khaira as Dhwani Pari/Diksha, a fairy of Pari Lok with the power of sound; Diksha on Earth as one of Baalveer's sisters. (2019–2021)
 Khushi Mukherjee / Urvi Gor as Jwala Pari/Jiya, a fairy of Pari Lok with the power of fire; Jiya on Earth as one of Baalveer's sisters. She was a Strict fairy than the others, and very much angry fairy towards evils. One time she burned the hand of Naagini. She was killed by Timnasa's weapons. (2019–2020) / (2020–2021)
 Amika Shail / Nandini Tiwari as Vayu Pari/Vidhi, a fairy of Pari Lok with the power of the wind; Vidhi on Earth as one of Baalveer's sisters. She was killed by Timnasa's weapons. (2019–2020) / (2020–2021) 
 Shoaib Ali as Ray, Jaikas's son. He has become the most powerful entity by Baalveer's blood and has now teamed up with Timnasa and Bhaymaar. (2020–2021)
 Vimarsh Roshan as Bambaal, the cunning antagonist, who was Jalraj Kaykos' younger brother and Commander. He wished to takeover Jalraj's throne and rule over the universe. He was killed by Senior Baalveer. (2020)
 Shweta Khanduri as Milsa. She was killed by Bambaal to hide their secret. (2020)
 Ayesha Khan as Birba, the new loyalist of Bambaal. She is the most successful scientist in Shinkai after Milsa. (2020)
 Jaya Binju as Karuna, Vivaan's adoptive and Khushi's biological mother and Dadasaheb's daughter-in-law.  Karuna is a businesswoman living in Bharat Nagar with her two children Khushi and Vivaan and her father-in-law. She runs a tiffin service business in which she delivers tiffin business. Sometimes, she also gives free food to poor people. (2019–2021)
 Khushi Bharadwaj 
 as Khushi, Vivaan's adoptive sister, Karuna's daughter, and Dadasaheb's granddaughter. She is a very good girl who always listens to her elders and loves her family. (2019–2021)
 as Kiki(Voice), a young female elephant calf who is Dooba-Dooba's best friend. (2019–2021)
 Arista Mehta as Sutli Girpade, Vivaan, and Gopu's close friend, and Padmini's daughter. She belongs to a middle-class family living in Bharat Nagar and she is intelligent. Her mother Padmini lives with Sutli's maternal uncle, Inspector Shantaram Girpade. (2019–2020)
 Sia Bhatia replaced Mehta as Sutli Girpade (2020–2021)
 Hridyansh Shekhawat as Gopu Chheda. He is Vivaan and Sutli's close friend. He, Vivaan, and Sutli plan to thwart the troubles created by Chintu and Chinti. His father is the owner of a general store in Bharat Nagar. (2019–2020)
 Yachit Sharma as Rinkoo, Vivaan and Sutli's friend. (2020–2021)
 Aarna Bhadoriya as Chinti Mishra, Chintu's sister, who keeps on troubling Vivaan and his paltan with her brother Chintu. (2019–2021)
 Abhay Bhadoriya as Chintu Mishra, Chinti's brother, who keeps on troubling Vivaan and his paltan with his sister Chinti. (2019–2021)
 Tiya Gandwani as Devaki, she was chosen as the queen and ruled over Shwet lok. She is the supreme controller of shwet lok. She is the sole decision maker. She is the  mother of Ananya and Vivaan and residents of shwet realm. (2020)
 Purvesh Pimple as Montu, Chintu-Chinti's cousin; Debu's arch enemy. (2020–2021)
 Priya Sharma as Nagini. She is a Gorgon and was brought to life by Bhaymar in Baghdad. She was defeated by Baalveer and Aladdin but came back to take revenge. She died because of her own poison. (2020)
 Samay Thakkar as Sarvakaal (voice), the monstrous sage of the Black Realm who was captured by Timnasa, and it was his cosmic power that helped Vivaan kill Timnasa. (2020)
 Tapan A. Bhatt as Dadasaheb, Vivaan's adoptive and Khushi's real paternal grandfather, and Karuna's father-in-law. He is a very talkative person. (2019–2021)
 Guru Saran Tiwari as Mr. Munna Mishra, a selfish and greedy man who is Chintu-Chinti's father and Kamini's husband. He always shows off his richness. (2019–2021)
 Anuradha Verma as Mrs. Kamini Mishra, Chintu-Chinti's mother, and Munna's wife. She also shows off her richness. (2019–2021)
 Akshay Bhagat as Mr. Ratilal Chheda, Gopu's father, and Diwali's husband who owns a shop. He is a miser. (2019–2021)
 Neha Prajapati as Mrs. Diwali Chheda, Gopu's mother, and Ratilal's wife. She is a very caring mother towards her son Gopu. (2019–2021)
 Ajay Padhye as Inspector Shantaram Girpade, a bachelor police Sub-Inspector who is Sutli's maternal uncle and Padmini's younger brother. He loves Masti Pari in her human form Megha, and always tries to impress her. (2019–2021)
 Shruti Gholap as Mrs. Padmini Girpade, Sutli's mother, and Girpade's elder sister. Her husband is unknown. She is a middle-class woman and doesn't have enough money to fulfill Sutli's demands. (2019–2021)
 Reena as Dr. Shalini, Rinkoo's mother who is a Gynaecologist. She did the operation on Karuna during her second delivery. (2020–2021)
 Heer Chopra as Saral Pari, a fairy of Pari Lok with the power of Simplicity: she can make anything that's hard simple to do. She was killed by Akroor for scaring Netra Pari. (2019)
 Alisha Chaudhary as Netra Pari/Timnasa, Netra Pari is a fairy of Pari Lok with the power of Vision. Her body was used by Timnasa against Baal Veer finding his successor. She was later killed by Timnasa. (2019)
 Shailesh Gulabani as Parikshak, a sidekick of Bambaal sent to earth for capturing Baalveer. (2020)
Shagun Singh as Jiya, Chintu Chinti's cousin and dancer, Vivaan's enemy later friend. (2020)
 Amit Lohia as Mahabali, the disciple of Guru Gyani who has a protective dress and crown which cannot be destroyed by Veer Lok's protective shield. Later, both the Baalveers manage to take off the protective dress and crown from his head. Guru Gyani then makes him good from evil and heads towards the Himalayas for meditation. (2021)
 Shresth Saxena as Akal, the hunter of goodness who converts good entities into trophies with his magical arrows. (2021)
 Shubh Saxena as Mand, twin brother of Akal and a hunter of goodness who converts good entities into trophies with his magical arrows. (2021)
 Kunal Bakshi as an evil Egyptian king Imaya. (2021)
 Sharik Khan as Vivaan and Sutli's friend. (2020–2021)
 Sharik Khan as Pichku (voice), a baby ghost who was trapped in Veer Lok by Shaurya and fairies; has the ability to turn into any object or go through it and can cure every disease or wound. (2021)
 Bharat Bhatia as Babban; Boss of Babban Seth and Sons who wanted to build Casino in the playground where kids play. (2021)
Myra Singh as Aarohi. She is from Benaras. She always wins all games. She has a catchphrase "UP ke nivasi hote hai bade he saahsi" ( Translation: The people of UP are very courageous.)
 Shweta Gautam as Radha Pandey, mother of Happy and Jolly Pandey. (2021)
 Mihir Rajda as Jolly Pandey, Happy's brother (2021)
 Dimple Kava as Dimple Pandey, Jolly Pandey's wife and Happy's sister-in-law (2021)
Ayat Shaikh as Kuki Pandey, Dimple and Jolly Pandey's daughter, and Happy's niece (2021)
Krish Rao as Puki Pandey, Dimple and Jolly Pandey's son and Happy's nephew (2021)
 Jaya Binju Tyagi as Karuna, Vivaan's adopted mother, and Khushi's real mother. (2021)
 Khushi Bhardwaj as Khushi, Vivaan's adoptive sister, Karuna's daughter
 Neha Prajapati as Mrs. Diwali Chheda, Gopu's mother, and Ratilal's wife. (2021)

Cameo appearances 
 Digvijay Purohit as Jalraj Kaikos, the ruler of the Shinkai kingdom and elder brother of Bambaal. (2020)
 Siddharth Nigam as Aladdin, the saviour of Baghdad from Zafar. He came from the past with Vivaan to help Baal Veer to defeat Timnasa in her attempt to become 'Trikaal Bhay Rani'. Aladdin bravely fought Timnasa and her companions. Later, he went back in the past to Baghdad with Ginu. (2020)
 Raashul Tandon as Ginu, or Chirag ka Jinn (Genie of the Lamp), who was taken by Timnasa from Zafar, the former Grand Vizier of Baghdad of the past. He was hypnotized by Timnasa so he would help Timnasa in her attempt to become 'Trikal Bhay Rani'. He was a very powerful Genie and he was loyal to Aladdin. Although Timnasa managed to achieve the 'Bhoot Mani' and 'Bhavishya Mani' with the help of Ginu, her plans were destroyed by Aladdin and Baal Veers. Later, he went back to the past with his master Aladdin. (2020)
 Aamir Dalvi as Zafar, a deceptive sorcerer, the former Grand Vizier of Baghdad, and a greedy man who plans to take over the world using the Genie of the Lamp's powers from the past. (2020)
 Ketan Karande as Tejas Pehelwan, a strong wrestler who was defeated by Happy in a wrestling competition. (2021)

Crossover
Baalveer Returns did a crossover with the series Aladdin – Naam Toh Suna Hoga for 5 episodes from 27 January 2020 to 31 January 2020 in Season 1.

Production

Development
The commencement of the show, a sequel to the children's fantasy series Baal Veer, was announced in early August 2019 by Optimystix Entertainment and Sony SAB. The first promo was released in August 2019. The new series cast Dev Joshi as Senior Baalveer, and introduced Vansh Sayani in a lead role as Baalveer's successor. Pavitra Punia was cast as the evil fairy, Timnasa.

Filming
The series is being taped on sets at Film City, in Mumbai, Maharashtra, India
After the Indian government announced the COVID-19 lockdown, the show ceased airing new episodes, along with other shows throughout the Indian entertainment industry. Four months later, after the government relaxed restrictions, the series resumed airing of new episodes, continuing with the storyline that had been interrupted.

Casting
In 2020, Pavitra Punia announced that she would exit the series after the end of the Kaal Lok storyline, to participate in Season 14 of Bigg Boss. Subsequently, Krutika Desai,  Amika Shail and Khushi Mukherjee also quit the show for other reasons. The storyline ended and producers announced a new season, introducing the underwater kingdom of Shinkai, which would be populated by new villains, Bambaal, Milsa and Ray, played by Vimarsh Roshan, Shweta Khanduri and Shoaib Ali, respectively. 
In mid-December 2020, makers announced that Vimarsh Roshan was leaving the series but he would return as Bhaymaar. In early January 2021, makers announced the return of Pavitra Punia as Timnasa also, following her eviction from Bigg Boss.

For Season 2, Dev Joshi played six different characters.

Reception
The first episode has over 45 million views on YouTube. Baalveer Returns episode 233 has over 72 million views on YouTube.

References

External links 
 Baalveer Returns on YouTube
 Baalveer Returns on SonyLIV
 Baalveer Returns on Sony SAB
 

Sony SAB original programming
Indian children's television series
Indian action television series
Indian superhero television shows
2019 Indian television series debuts
Television about fairies and sprites
Television series by Optimystix Entertainment
Indian fantasy television series